The 1986–87 season was Real Madrid Club de Fútbol's 85th season in existence and the club's 56th consecutive season in the top flight of Spanish football.

Season 
It was the longest season ever for Real Madrid. The league had two phases. In the first one, all 18 teams played each other twice (home and away). At the end of the first phase, the first six teams qualified for the championship group (Group A), the next six qualified for the intermediate group (Group B) and the last six qualified for the relegation group (Group C). In the second phase, Real Madrid played only against teams of the same group twice (home and away) and carried over their first phase record. The team played 44 games overall, finishing with 66 points and claiming its 22nd league title in history.

Squad

Transfers

In

 from Sevilla FC
 from Sporting Gijón
 from Real Zaragoza
 from Crvena Zvezda (from 1 April 1987)

Out

 to Real Zaragoza
 to RCD Español
 to RCD Mallorca
 (retired)
(retired)

Competitions

La Liga

Results by round

League table

Matches

Playoff

Copa del Rey

Eightfinals

Quarter-finals

Semi-finals

European Cup

First round

Second round

Quarter-finals

Semi-finals

Statistics

Squad statistics

Players statistics

See also
La Quinta del Buitre

References

Real Madrid CF seasons
Real Madrid CF
Spanish football championship-winning seasons